Lady Tetley's Decree is a 1920 British silent drama film directed by Fred Paul and starring Marjorie Hume, Hamilton Stewart and Philip Hewland. Its plot follows a man whose political career is threatened due to a dispute with his wife. It was based on a play by Sybil Downing.

Cast
 Marjorie Hume - Lady Rachel Tetly
 Hamilton Stewart - Sir Oliver Tetley
 Philip Hewland - Robert Trentham
 Basil Langford - Ronald Tetley
 Sydney Lewis Ransome - Lionel Crier
 Bernard Vaughan - Lord Herondale

References

External links

1920 films
British silent feature films
1920 drama films
Films directed by Fred Paul
British films based on plays
British drama films
British black-and-white films
1920s English-language films
1920s British films
Silent drama films